A cruiser is a type of naval warship.

Cruiser may also refer to:

People
 "The Cruiser" nickname of Conor Cruise O'Brien (1917-2008), Irish politician and writer
 A passenger on a cruise ship

Vehicles

Air
 ATA Cruiser, an American light aircraft of the 1920s
 Spartan Cruiser, a 1930s British six-passenger monoplane

Land
 Cruiser (motorcycle)
 Cruiser bicycle
 Cruiser tank, a type of tank designed for cavalry or high-speed operations
 Chrysler PT Cruiser, a small passenger car
 Police cruiser, a term for certain police cars
 Toyota Land Cruiser, a sport-utility vehicle

Water
 Aircraft cruiser, a specific type of naval cruiser
 Armed merchantman (also  known as an auxiliary cruiser), a specific type of naval cruiser
 Armored cruiser, a specific type of naval cruiser
 Battlecruiser, a specific type of naval cruiser
 Cabin cruiser, a type of power boat or a UK term for a motorboat designed for inland waters
 Cruiser yacht, a sailing yacht built for long-distance sailing that allows permanent crew
 Heavy cruiser, a specific type of naval cruiser
 Light cruiser, a specific type of naval cruiser
 MV Cruiser, a charter cruise vessel owned by Clyde Maritime Services, built in 1974
 Protected cruiser, a specific type of naval cruiser
 Scout cruiser, a specific type of naval cruiser
 Torpedo gunboat (also known as a Torpedo cruiser), a specific type of naval cruiser
 Unprotected cruiser, a specific type of naval cruiser

Arts, entertainment, and media
 "Cruiser" (song), a song by The Cars from their 1981 album Shake It Up
 The Cruiser, a novel by Warren Tute
 "The Cruiser (Judgment Day)", a song by Gotthard from their 2007 album Domino Effect

Other
 Cruiser (butterfly), species of the genus Vindula
 Cruiser, a pesticide toxic to bees
 Vodka Cruiser, an alcoholic beverage

See also
 Cruise (disambiguation)
 Cruising (disambiguation)
 Cruizer (disambiguation)
 Cruse (disambiguation)
 Cruz (disambiguation)
 Cruze (disambiguation)
 Cruzer
 Kruse (disambiguation)

pt:Cruzeiro